is a Japanese film released on 29 May 2010. The film was produced by Shūji Abe, directed by Yoshinari Nishikōri, and stars Kiichi Nakai and Reiko Takashima.

Plot
The movie tells the story of a 49-year-old office worker, who quits his job in Tokyo to become a train driver on the rural Ichibata Electric Railway in Shimane Prefecture.

Cast
 Kiichi Nakai as Hajime Tsutsui
 Yuika Motokariya as Sachi, Hajime's daughter
 Reiko Takashima as Yukiko, Hajime's wife
 Tomoko Naraoka as Kinyo, Hajime's mother
 Takahiro Miura as Miyata Daigo
 Isao Hashizume as the Ichibata Railway chief
 Shiro Sano as the Ichibata Railway deputy
 Yoshiko Miyazaki as Moriyama, a nurse
 Kenichi Endō as Kawahira
 Ken Nakamoto as Nishida
 Masahiro Komoto as Fukushima, the chief instructor
 Tetsu Watanabe as Takahashi, a veteran train mechanic
 Kanta Ogata as Yabuuchi, the train driver trainer
 Masanori Ishii as Takubo, the railway controller
 Matsunosuke Shofukutei as Toyo, the gardener

References

External links
Official website
 

2010 films
Rail transport films
Films set in Shimane Prefecture
2010s Japanese films